The Old German Baptist Brethren Church, also known as Fraternity Church, Old Order Church, and Old Fraternity Church, is a historic German Baptist Brethren church located near Winston-Salem, Forsyth County, North Carolina.  The original section was built in 1860, and is a one-story, front-gable-roofed, heavy-timber-frame meetinghouse.  Two frame additions were added to the rear in 1942 and in 1950.

It was listed on the National Register of Historic Places in 2014.

References

Churches on the National Register of Historic Places in North Carolina
Churches completed in 1860
Churches in Forsyth County, North Carolina
National Register of Historic Places in Winston-Salem, North Carolina